Two existing armies have been known in English as the Chinese Army:

 People's Liberation Army Ground Force, the land force component of the People's Liberation Army in the People's Republic of China
 Republic of China Army, which succeeded the National Revolutionary Army in 1947 and retreated to Taiwan in 1949

For the Chinese army between 1927 and 1947, see:
 National Revolutionary Army

For Chinese armies before 1912, see:
 Military history of China before 1911

See also
 Chinese military (disambiguation)
 People's Liberation Army (disambiguation)